The Saskatoon Arena was an indoor arena located in Saskatoon, Saskatchewan. It opened 30 October 1937 on a site overlooking the South Saskatchewan River.  It was a wooden arena constructed in Saskatoon's downtown core.

On opening day, it hosted a game between the New York Rangers and New York Americans, and was home to the Saskatoon Blades of the Western Hockey League for many years. It was also used for the city's annual Remembrance Day services as well as for major musical performances.

Nicknamed "The Barn", the facility had outlived its usefulness by the 1970s and had become infamous for its leaky roof and substandard amenities. Yet Saskatonians were hesitant to lose the landmark and a number of years passed between the first proposal in the 1970s to replace the structure and its eventual closure in the late 1980s. The last hockey game played in the arena took place on February 2, 1988 as Saskatoon beat the Regina Pats 7–2 before 3,308 fans. The next week, the new Saskatchewan Place opened.  Saskatoon Arena was demolished in 1989.

During the summer of 1989, the Arena site was transformed into an amphitheatre hosting cultural events during the Canada Summer Games. During this time the city was considering a riverbank redevelopment project and it was thought that the Arena site could retain the amphitheatre, but in 1992, city council decided instead to approve construction of Clinkskill Manor, a low income seniors highrise. Plans for riverbank redevelopment continued, however, and were formally revived in the 2000s with the River Landing project.

The site is the location of an ironic piece of street naming. For many years a Saunders Avenue provided access to Saskatchewan Place; but after the 2002 death of Bill Hunter, a businessman who attempted to build a new arena in the city, the street was renamed Bill Hunter Avenue (even though Hunter was known to have opposed the location of Saskatchewan Place). The name Saunders was then transferred to Saunders Place, a street that provides access to Clinkskill Manor and runs through the former site of the Saskatoon Arena.

Tenants

References

Defunct indoor ice hockey venues in Canada
Defunct indoor arenas in Canada
Sports venues in Saskatchewan
Buildings and structures in Saskatoon
Sport in Saskatoon
Western Hockey League arenas
Sports venues demolished in 1989